The Paz Show (also known as Paz the Penguin stylized PAZ) is a British animated television series that debuted on February 24, 2003 on Discovery Kids and TLC in the United States. It also aired on  ITV in the United Kingdom. The show was produced by Netherlands-based Telescreen BV, Denmark-based Egmont Imagination, King Rollo Films and Open Mind Productions, in association with Discovery Kids. The series was based on a series of books written and illustrated by Mary Murphy.

Between the series cancellation and October 8, 2010, the series continued to rerun on the Ready Set Learn block.

Cast and characters

Main cast
 Tim Lagasse as Paz, a playful little penguin with an American accent who is the main character of the series. He is a fuzzy five-year-old penguin, is as optimistic as he is curious, it is not unusual for Paz, in his enthusiasm, to encounter a few roadblocks on his way to adventure, but he sometimes has his mother, Big Penguin, his grandfather, Pappy, and his friends to encourage him on the way. He is occasionally seen playing his trumpetar in a few episodes, his trumpetar is an orange kazoo-like instrument with sitar strings, when played, it plays a similar tune matching the series instrumentals. Starting from 2003, he starred as the mascot of the Ready Set Learn block until 2010 when the Discovery Kids channel relaunched as the Hub Network. He has a black coat and feet, a white face and a belly, and a yellow chest and a beak.
 Rebecca Nagan as Big Penguin, Paz's loving single mother who works as an architect. She seems to speak in a British accent in a few episodes. Paz's father is never shown in the series. She has a similar appearance as Paz, only to have a yellow lining around her stomach. Starting from "The Locket", she has been shown wearing a bronze locket that she had inherited from her own mother with a photo of her son in it.
 Margot Caroni as Pig, a sassy pig with an Italian accent. She is shown to be very talented at playing the violin in "Band Wagon" and great at tap dancing in "The Right Moves".
 Charlotte Bellamy as Rabbit, an outgoing rabbit with an English accent. She is highly energetic and likes to drum on trash can lids. She has a little sister named Carrot. She is white with an orange right ear and a tail.
 Anton Rodgers as Pappy, a macaroni penguin as Paz's grandfather and Big Penguin's possible father who is a retired traveller. Pappy lives alone in colorful house that resembles a Mediterranean house which was revealed to have location-themed rooms in "My Senses" besides his bedroom and guest room which were only shown in "Baby Can't Sleep". The episode, "Fun with Pappy" reveals that Pappy resembled Paz when he was his age while currently resembling his own grandfather. Pappy is somewhat pretty talented at playing the tuba, and occasionally plays songs for Paz and his friends. He is an elder penguin with a pair of yellow crests that matches the big spot on his chest and sometimes appears with a red vest jacket and a blue and red explorer helmet.
 Liam McMahon as Dog, a shy dog with an Irish accent and yellow orange fur. Despite appearing in a few initial episodes, Dog seems to be Paz's new neighbor in "New Dog". He wears a magenta collar and is often seen playing a maraca on his tail.

One-time appearing characters
 Maria Darling as Adelie, Paz's imaginary Antarctican friend who appears in "Sledding". She lives in Paz's South Pole fantasy. Her role was to help Paz find his sled in the snow. When they have found the lost sled which was found on top of a whale's blowhole, they go for a little swim in the whale's frozen lake home before retrieving it from the whale. Adelie was last seen riding on the sled with Paz, before saying goodbye to him as he concludes his fantasy.

Episodes

Awards and nominations
Silver Honor - 2005 Parents' Choice Award
Nominee - 2005 Humanitas Prize for Children's Television (episode Things Change by James Still)
Nominee - 32nd Daytime Emmy Awards (2005) for Pre-school Children's Series
Nominee - 33rd Daytime Emmy Awards (2006) for Pre-school Children's Series
Nominee - 34th Daytime Emmy Awards (2007) for Outstanding Pre-school Children's Series

References

External links

2003 British television series debuts
2008 British television series endings
2000s British animated television series
2000s British children's television series
2000s preschool education television series
Animated preschool education television series
British preschool education television series
British television series with live action and animation
British television shows based on children's books
British television shows featuring puppetry
British children's animated television shows
Animated television series about penguins
Animated television series about children
Animated television series about animals